Conversations on a Sunday Afternoon is a 2005 South African documentary directed by Khalo Matabane. The 80-minute film blends documentary and fiction as it explores the subject of refugees and immigrants living in South Africa, and the diversity of post-Apartheid South African society.

References

External links
 Conversations on a Sunday Afternoon on Internet Movie Database

Best Documentary Africa Movie Academy Award winners
South African documentary films
2005 films
2005 documentary films
Immigration to South Africa
Documentary films about immigration